Ysgol Calon Cymru (meaning 'Heart of Wales School') is a bilingual secondary comprehensive school with campuses in Builth Wells and Llandrindod Wells, Powys, mid Wales. It replaced Builth Wells High School and Llandrindod High School and opened at the former schools' sites in September 2018.

History

Builth Wells High School and Llandrindod High School

Ysgol Calon Cymru was created as a new school on the sites of the former high schools of Builth Wells and Llandrindod Wells in Powys.

Ysgol Calon Cymru
A decision to replace Builth Wells High School and Llandrindod High School was made by Powys County Council in September 2016 and confirmed in February 2017, despite the council receiving more than 1,700 letters of objection. Llandrindod High School, with 600 pupils, had been put into special measures in 2014 by the school inspection body, Estyn, but by the end of the 2017/18 academic year 74% of pupils attained at least five A*-C grades at GCSE. Builth Wells High School had seen 66% of its pupils attain at least five A*-C grades at GCSE in the 2016/17 year. £3.6 million was used in 2018 from the Welsh Government’s 21st Century Schools programme to improve the school facilities at the Llandrindod High School site.

In February 2018 the new name for the school, Ysgol Calon Cymru, was announced, following consultation with staff and pupils at the secondary schools and their feeder primary schools. The new Ysgol Calon Cymru opened on the sites of its two predecessor secondary schools in September 2018, providing English-medium education on both sites and Welsh-medium education at the Builth Wells site.

Leadership team

In late 2017 the governors announced their appointment of Mrs Ionwen Spowage, former Head Teacher of Builth Wells High School to be that of Ysgol Calon Cymru, commencing inceptive work in January 2018. The full leadership team was agreed and announced shortly thereafter.

At the beginning of 2019, the original headteacher announced that she was to become Head of Ysgol Bro Dinefwr in Carmarthenshire with effect from Easter. Governors selected Mr Steve Patten and Mr Lee Powell as the acting Heads pending their formal decision of the permanent-contract replacement.

In December 2019, the governors announced that Mr Richard Jones would take up post as Headteacher from January 2020. Chair of Governors Sharon Hammond said Mr Jones would bring “invaluable knowledge and experience” to the school. Mrs Janet Waldron would also join the school as Executive Leader on a two-year contract.

Facilities

Ysgol Calon Cymru consists of two campuses, one located in Builth Wells and one located in Llandrindod Wells. In 2022, the school opened a new Sixth Form Centre and Community Hub in Llandrindod Wells on the site of the town's former Youth Centre and Scout Hall. The building is located within the school grounds close to the main campus and, in addition to being a centre for the school's Sixth Form, has also continued to be used by local community groups such as Scouts, Guides, Brownies and Rainbows and the Llandrindod Youth Club. Upon the centre's opening, Ysgol Calon Cymru headteacher Richard Jones said that Ysgol Calon Cymru "is very proud of its community links and we hope that this facility will strengthen them further."

Extracurricular

Sport

Ysgol Calon Cymru has a strong sports department, and offers extracurricular activities in athletics, basketball, football, netball, rugby and squash. The school and its predecessors have produced multiple athletes who have represented Wales, including football international Alice Evans and rugby union international Dan Lydiate. In November 2022, Ysgol Calon Cymru's U18 rugby team reached the final of the Welsh Schools Rugby Union Vase, with the final due to take place at the Millennium Stadium in Cardiff in March 2023.

Notable former pupils

The following notable people were educated at Ysgol Calon Cymru (or its predecessors Builth Wells High School and Llandrindod High School):

  John Bufton (born 1962), MEP for Wales
  Alice Evans (born 1994), Wales football international and futsal player
 Dan Lydiate (born 1988), Wales rugby union international

References

External links
 

Educational institutions established in 2018
Calon Cymru
2018 establishments in Wales
Builth Wells
Llandrindod Wells